St. Joseph School is a private, Catholic PreK-12 school in Conway, Arkansas, United States.  It is located in the Roman Catholic Diocese of Little Rock. It is often referred to as St. Joseph School, Conway. With 140+ years of educating students in the Catholic tradition, St. Joseph School provides a safe, welcoming environment that fosters academic excellence through individual student support, hands-on learning, the latest technology, and small class sizes. St. Joseph School strives to develop the whole student--mind, body, & spirit. As a Catholic school, we inspire in our students a love of Christ, a dedication to service, and a strong desire to learn.

Our NEW 7th-12th grade High School building is open, providing more academic opportunities for our students. The new High School includes a Black Box Theater, all the latest technology, amazing Fine Arts rooms, an Industrial Technology lab, and so much more! While our standardized test scores are consistently above state and national averages, we continue to grow in our faith formation and experience many educational successes at all levels.

References

External links

 

Catholic secondary schools in Arkansas
Educational institutions established in 1898
Schools in Faulkner County, Arkansas
Roman Catholic Diocese of Little Rock
Buildings and structures in Conway, Arkansas
Private high schools in Arkansas
Private middle schools in Arkansas
Private elementary schools in Arkansas
Catholic K–8 schools in the United States
Catholic elementary schools in the United States
1898 establishments in Arkansas